The Cairos were a Brisbane musical group signed to Island Records Australia. The band formed in Brisbane in 2007 and consisted of members Alistar Richardson on vocals and guitar, Alfio Alivuzza on guitar, Reuben Schafer on bass and Jacob Trotter on drums. 

The group released one studio album, working with renowned producer Nick Didia. Dream of Reason was released in May 2014 and peaked at No. 6 on the ARIA Hitseekers Albums chart.

Discography

Studio albums

Extended plays

Awards

Q Song Awards
The Queensland Music Awards (previously known as Q Song Awards) are annual awards celebrating Queensland, Australia's brightest emerging artists and established legends. They commenced in 2006.

 (wins only)
|-
| 2010
| "Today's Song"
| QMusic Encouragement Award 
| 
|}

References

External links 

Australian indie rock groups
Musical groups established in 2009
Musical groups disestablished in 2016
Australian indie pop groups
Musical groups from Brisbane